Deanna Brooks (born Deanna Wilson on April 30, 1974, in Boulder City, Nevada) is an American glamour model and actress who was Playboy magazine's Playmate of the Month in May, 1998. She was a 1992 graduate of Bellbrook (OH) High School and worked as a bank teller for Key Bank before her Playboy appearance. She was previously married to Tony Brooks.

She was also photographed by celebrity photographer William Shatner for the Cyber Club in 2004.

Filmography
10 Playboy videos
The Rowdy Girls (2000)
Girls of the Hard Rock Hotel & Casino Las Vegas (2001)
For F**k's Sake (2004) 
Candy Stripers (2006)
Dealin' With Idiots (2013)

Notable TV guest appearances
Wild On! playing "Herself" in episode: "Women of the World" 30 August 2001
Cold Pizza playing "Herself" 17 December 2004

References

External links
 (inoperative)

American film actresses
American television actresses
1990s Playboy Playmates
1974 births
Living people
People from Bellbrook, Ohio
People from Boulder City, Nevada
21st-century American women